The Independent Spirit Awards (abbreviated Spirit Awards and originally known as the FINDIE or Friends of Independents Awards), founded in 1984, are awards dedicated to independent filmmakers. Winners were typically presented with acrylic glass pyramids containing suspended shoestrings representing the bare budgets of independent films. Since 2006, winners have received a metal trophy depicting a bird with its wings spread sitting atop of a pole with the shoestrings from the previous design wrapped around the pole.

In 1986, the event was renamed the Independent Spirit Awards. Now called the Film Independent Spirit Awards, the show isproduced by Film Independent, a not-for-profit arts organization that used to produce the LA Film Festival. Film Independent members vote to determine the winners of the Spirit Awards.

The awards show is held inside a tent in a parking lot at the beach in Santa Monica, California, usually on the day before the Academy Awards (since 1999; originally the Saturday before). The show was previously broadcast live on the IFC network in the US until 2023 when it was moved to YouTube, as well as Hollywood Suite in Canada and A&E Latin America.

In 2020, new categories were announced for the 36th Independent Spirit Awards, which would honor the best in television productions and performances. These categories included Best New Scripted Series, Best New Non-Scripted or Documentary Series, Best Male Performance, Best Female Performance, and Best Ensemble Cast. In 2022, it was announced that gender neutral acting categories would be implemented and that the previous gendered film categories — Male Lead, Female Lead, Male Supporting and Female Supporting — would be retired in favor of a Best Lead Performance and a Best Supporting Performance categories, which would feature 10 nominees each. Other new categories added included Best Breakthrough Performance and Best Lead and Supporting Performance in the TV section.

Categories
Current categories

Retired categories

History
The Independent Features Project/West was founded by Gregory Nava and Anna Thomas.

In 1984 the FINDIE Awards (Friends of Independents) were conceived by Independent Features Project/West board member Jeanne Lucas and Independent Features Project/West President Anne Kimmel and director/writer Sam O'Brien was an event producer. The awards are voted on by a nominating committee.

In 1985, Peter Coyote and Jamie Lee Curtis presented winners with a Plexiglas pyramid designed by Carol Bosselman, which contain a suspended shoestring, printed with sprocket holes, representing the shoestring budgets of independent films. The Reel Gold Award, also designed by Bosselman,  was given to Steve Wachtel for allowing Independent Features Project/West continuing free use of his screening room. It was associated with Filmex.  In 1986, Bosselman designed and sculpted the Independent Spirit Award statue that is still given out today, using a lost wax bronze casting method.

Independent Features Project/West eventually became Film Independent.

Dawn Hudson was director of Independent Features Project/West in 1995.

Barbara Boyle was Independent Features Project/West president from 1994 to 1999.

Independent Features Project eventually became Independent Filmmaker Project.

Ceremonies

See also
 American Cinematheque 
 Sundance Film Festival
 Indiewood

References

 
American film awards
Awards established in 1984
1984 establishments in the United States